Robert Ernest Pepper (May 3, 1895 – April 8, 1968) was a pitcher in Major League Baseball. He played one game for the Philadelphia Athletics in 1915.

References

External links

1895 births
1968 deaths
Major League Baseball pitchers
Philadelphia Athletics players
Baseball players from Pennsylvania